Leucodon sciuroides is a species of mosses belonging to the family Leucodontaceae.

It has cosmopolitan distribution.

References

Hypnales